Enzo Squillino Jr. is a British actor and photographer.

Life and career
Enzo Squillino Jnr was born in Sheffield, West Riding of Yorkshire, England and was trained at the Mountview Theatre Academy in London. He portrayed the role of Ritchie Valens in the West End musical Buddy – The Buddy Holly Story. Later, he established a reputation on-screen as a dramatic and comic actor as cockney wide boy George Andreotti in the television drama series The Knock. In March 2021, he appeared in an episode of the BBC soap opera Doctors as Tony Loreto.

Performances

Television
 Carnival Row
 Henry VIII
 Mister Winner
 Carnival Row II
 Delicious
 Holby City
 Undercover
 The Collection
 Doctors
 Above Suspicion
 Zen
 The Game
 The Collection
 Law & Order
 The Bill
 EastEnders
 Judas
 Jack of Hearts
 The Knock
 Birds of a Feather
 Coasting
 The Old Boy Network
 The Hutton Inquiry
 Nothing Like a Royal Show
 London's Burning
 The Labours of Erica
 Saturday Matters
 That's English

Films
 Jurassic World Dominion
 The Hitman's Wife's Bodyguard
 Paddington 2
 Much Ado About Nothing
 Nine
 Mamma Mia!
 Incendiary
 Superstition
 Diana
 Brothers of Italy

Music videos
 I Don't Wanna Live Forever

Theater
 A View From The Bridge
 Saturday Night Fever
 Much Ado About Nothing
 Of Mice and Men
 The Buddy Holly Story

Video games
 Mutant Year Zero: Road to Eden
 Mutant Year Zero: Seed of Evil

References

External links 
 

Living people
Male actors from Sheffield
English male film actors
English male stage actors
English male television actors
Year of birth missing (living people)